The monument to Dositej Obradović is located in the Academy Park, Belgrade, Serbia. Obradović was Serbian writer, educator and the reformer from the revolutionary period of the national awakening and rebirth. Also in the park are monuments of the prominent Serbian scientists Josif Pančić  and Jovan Cvijić, near Belgrade University.

Design and construction
The monument was built as a result of the initiative of the Serbian Literary Cooperative and Јоvan Skerlić, an admirer of Obradović. After some preliminary discussions for the monument, formal plans were made to construct the monument for the 100 year anniversary of Obradović's death in 1911.  The Committee for the Celebration was formed, led by Stojan Novaković  and Jovan Skerlić, to plan for a series of festivities and the construction of the monument. The project was supported by the Municipality of Belgrade that provided funding and conducted a competition for Yugoslav artists to design the monument of a full-sized figure of Obradović. Rudolf Valdec was the artist selected from the competition. In an article on the occasion of presentation of the models received for the competition, the magazine New Spark said about the Valdec's design: “Dositej was conceived as a traveller, boldly moved forward by some supernatural power, which was awakened in him. His eyes were directed to the lofty target, to which his feet should carry him. Books under his arm and pen in his hand show his noble mission. It is felt that the way, which he clears before him, goes to the glory and eternity.”

Although it was originally scheduled the monument to be officially unveiled on 1 September 1911, due to the site selection for its set up, this event took place three years later on was officially unveiled on 27 May 1914. in the Square in front of the Hotel “Serbian Crown” (now the City Library of Belgrade).

Description
It was installed as a pair to Karađorđe's  monument, unveiled a year before, at the end of the main path banked with the busts of important Serbs. In this way Obradović was brought in direct parallel with the leader of the First Serbian Uprising. The sculpture was placed on a high rectangular plinth on whose front side was carved the following inscription: “To Dositej Obradović, from Grateful Serbian People”, and on the reverse the writer`s motto taken from the Letter to Haralampije:  "I will write for the mind, heart and character of the people, for brothers Serbs whatever their law or religion." Obradović is represented in movement, with a hat, books and a stick in his hand, while at the bottom of the plinth there is an inscription of his own words: “He learns walking, looking into the future!”

Academic park
Until the end of the third decade of the 20th century, the monument was at its original location, in the square in front of the Hotel Serbian Crown, when, during the formation of the Academic park on the site of the former Great Market, it was moved to this park as a pair to the monument dedicated to the great Serbian scientist Josif Pančić. The Monument to Dositej Obradović was declared cultural monument in 1967.

Gallery

Notes

References

Further reading
 Documentation of the Cultural Heritage Protection Institute of the City of Belgrade – The file of the cultural monument. 
 М. Тimotijević, The Hero of the Pen: typological genesis of the public national monuments and Valdec`s sculpture of Dositej Obradović, The Heritage, III, Belgrade, 2001, 39–56.
 S.Мihajlov, The Monument to Dositej Obradović, the catalogue of the cultural monuments, Belgrade 2011.

1914 sculptures
Monuments and memorials in Belgrade
Monuments and memorials in Serbia
Cultural depictions of Serbian men